Bait is a 1954 American film noir, written, directed and produced by Hugo Haas. Haas himself, Cleo Moore and John Agar star in the film.

Plot

Middle-aged Marko (Haas) is searching for a lost gold mine for nearly 20 years. To share expenses for a prospecting expedition he teams up with bright young Ray Brighton (Agar). When they find the mine Marko decides he doesn't want to share with his partner and plans to murder him. He figures that after the two of them spend the winter together with Marko's trashy young wife (Moore) in a shack far from civilization, he will sooner or later catch them in adultery, and he can use the "unwritten law" to kill Brighton and thus escape punishment from the law. But the plot backfires.

Cast
 Cleo Moore as Peggy
 Hugo Haas as Marko
 John Agar as Ray Brighton
 Emmett Lynn as Foley
 Bruno VeSota as Webb
 Jan Englund as Waitress
 George Keymas as Chuck
 Cedric Hardwicke as Prologue Speaker

References

External links
 
 
 

1954 films
1954 crime drama films
American crime drama films
American black-and-white films
Columbia Pictures films
Films directed by Hugo Haas
Treasure hunt films
Films about mining
1950s English-language films
1950s American films